Dimitra (before 1928: Δίβριτσα – Divritsa) is a village and a community in the municipal unit of Kontovazaina, Arcadia, Greece. In 2011, it had a population of 103 for the village, and 111 for the community, which includes the village Stavri. Dimitra is situated on a mountain slope on the right bank of the river Ladon. It is 3 km southeast of Kontovazaina, 7 km northwest of Tropaia, 5 km northwest of the Ladon Lake dam and 50 km northwest of Tripoli.

Population

See also
List of settlements in Arcadia

References

External links
Dimitra at the GTP Travel Pages

Populated places in Arcadia, Peloponnese